Moreh Maru (English: Moreh Tablet) is a 2016 Indian Meitei language comedy film directed by O. Gautam and written by Laishram Santosh. It stars Gurumayum Bonny, Bala Hijam, Mukabala (Loya) and Roshan Pheiroijam in the lead roles. Moreh Maru was premiered at MSFDS on 26 October 2016, and released on 27 October 2016 at Bhagyachandra Open Air Theatre (BOAT), Palace Compound, Imphal. The film was also screened at Shankar Lal Auditorium, Delhi University, New Delhi, on 6 November 2016. This film is a sequel to the 2013 hit Manipuri film Beragee Bomb. The film was screened at Usha Cinema, Paona Bazar from 31 December 2016, but the film didn't run long in the theatre due to piracy issues. The DVDs of the film were released on 13 January 2017.

Plot
The story revolves around a drug dealer (Bonny) who is facing post accidental bomb blast injury crisis and the revenge he wants to take to his enemy, related to the bomb blast. Two broken hearted fellow (Mukabala & Roshan) falls to the trap of Bonny on the day of eloping Manipuri film star Bala. Mukabala happens to take drug that is indirectly supplied by Bonny due to some challenges with his peer member. His drugs' chemical reaction leads to fantasizing about different super heroes and Bala, the film star.  He is also blinded with the situation happening around and stealing of sub inspector's (Prem Sharma) gun during frisking. Prem Sharma faces a major challenge of losing his gun and suspension from his job. He starts his journey to find Mukabala. On the other side, Roshan is nowhere to be found after the night of eloping with Bala. Bala and Mukabala drive out to find Roshan. Mukabala, haunted by his memory and the problems he has created during that previous night, aimlessly starts walking to find Roshan. The story is intermingled with the given above characters and their hope to solve their problems.

Cast
 Gurumayum Bonny as Manibabu
 Bala Hijam as Bala
 Roshan Pheiroijam
 Mukabala (Loya)
 Prasanta Oinam
 Prem Sharma
 Tayenjam Mema
 Idhou
 Govin
 G.S. Nanao
 Ibomcha

Soundtrack
Sorri Senjam & Khelen composed the soundtrack for the film and Romi Meitei and Homen D' Wai wrote the lyrics. The songs are titled Moreh Maru and Oh Bala Oh Bala.

Accolades

Promotions
Moreh Maru was promoted in the Saturday night special edition of Manung Hutna of Impact TV on 22 October 2016, hosted by Raj Nongthombam. Besides this, T-shirts with prints of Moreh Maru posters were also made available to the public prior to the premiere of the movie as a part of the promotion.

References

2010s Meitei-language films
Indian comedy films
2016 films
2016 comedy films